The 1982 Pennsylvania gubernatorial election was held on November 2, 1982, between incumbent Republican Dick Thornburgh and Democratic U.S. Congressman Allen E. Ertel.

Republican primary
Incumbent Governor Dick Thornburgh ran unopposed for the Republican nomination.

Democratic primary

Candidates
Steve Douglas, Philadelphia political consultant
Allen Ertel, U.S. Representative from Williamsport
Eugene Knox, Northumberland County dentist
Earl McDowell, Fayette County businessman

Results

General election

Campaign
Thornburgh, who maintained high approval ratings during his first term, was initially considered a shoo-in for reelection, especially after the Democrats' top candidate, Philadelphia District Attorney (and future governor) Ed Rendell, declined to seek the nomination. Ertel struggled early with fundraising and, because of his residence in heavily Republican Central Pennsylvania, lacked a base among the state's strongest Democratic constituents: urban voters and organized labor. However, as a serious recession hit the state, Ertel campaigned hard against the economic policies of President Ronald Reagan, whom Ertel blamed for failing to protect the state's manufacturing sector; Thornburgh was forced to distance himself from Reagan as support for Reaganomics waned.

The state's political environment strongly favored Ertel not only because of national issues, but because the governmental cuts undertaken by Thornburgh during his term as governor had caused him to lose the support of several traditionally Democratic-leaning organizations that had once stood by his side, such as the NAACP and the state's teachers' union. However, Ertel ran a relatively mediocre campaign and hurt his chances with several gaffes, such as accusing the governor of exploiting his disabled son's condition for political gain. Ertel's own mistakes were considered to be a crucial component in Thornburgh's win.

Results

Notes

References

 

1982
Gubernatorial
Pennsylvania